The Communist League was a political party in Denmark. KF was founded on 21 January 1973 in Århus, by the 'Leninist Fraction' (a name given to them by their opponents) inside the Left Socialists (VS).

The Leninist Fraction had emerged in 1970, due to the disillusionment of a faction within VS that wanted a stronger focus on labour struggles. The faction was able to push through a new party programme and win leadership of VS at the fourth VS congress in 1971.

VS then plunged into factional infighting. The conflicts reached their peak at the fifth congress in November 1972, after which the faction left VS. In fact, the faction was able to gather a majority of the delegates at the 1972 congress, but in spite of this they opted to leave VS and form a new organization on the grounds that it was not possible to build a militant and revolutionary organization cohabitating with hippies and anti-trade union tendencies. Around 300 VS members followed the faction to found KF, leaving VS with just around 300 members.

KF was mainly  centered on Århus and Ålborg, which had been the main bases of the group that had left VS. In Århus it had a base among student activists, grouped in the 'Students Front'. The Copenhagen branch of KF was quite weak, however.

KF established new branches in Odense and Helsingør, and became the leading force in the revolutionary left in Århus, Ålborg and Odense.

KF started publishing Vejen til Socialismen in 1976 and Arbejderpolitik in 1977.

In 1975, factional conflicts surged within KF. One section, centered in the university environment in Århus, emerged as a group called the 'Coffee Club' (Kaffeklubben). It proposed certain renewals of the strategy of KF. Ahead of the 1977 congress, a document, based upon the inputs from the Coffee Club, was approved as a strategic document of KF. A minority, based in Copenhagen, which wanted a more Leninist line organized itself as the Communist League - Politics and left KF.

In 1980 KF was dissolved and its members joined VS. During its existence, KF held seven congresses and various annual summer camps.

External links

Defunct communist parties in Denmark
1973 establishments in Denmark
1980 disestablishments in Denmark
Political parties established in 1973
Political parties disestablished in 1980